Monsicha Tararattanakul (born 10 March 1998) is a Thai karateka. She won one of the bronze medals in the women's kata event at the 2018 Asian Games held in Jakarta, Indonesia. She has also won medals at the Southeast Asian Games and the Asian Karate Championships.

Career 

At the 2017 Asian Karate Championships held in Astana, Kazakhstan, she won one of the bronze medals in the women's individual kata event. She also won one of the bronze medals in the women's individual kata event at the 2017 Southeast Asian Games in Kuala Lumpur, Malaysia. In 2018, she competed in the women's individual kata event at the World Karate Championships held in Madrid, Spain where she was eliminated in her first match by Sakura Kokumai of the United States.

In 2019, she won one of the bronze medals in the women's individual kata event at the Southeast Asian Games held in the Philippines. She also won one of the bronze medals in this event at the 2017 Southeast Asian Games in Kuala Lumpur, Malaysia.

She won the silver medal in the women's individual kata event at the 2021 Southeast Asian Games held in Hanoi, Vietnam.

Achievements

References 

Living people
1998 births
Place of birth missing (living people)
Monsicha Tararattanakul
Karateka at the 2018 Asian Games
Asian Games medalists in karate
Monsicha Tararattanakul
Medalists at the 2018 Asian Games
Monsicha Tararattanakul
Monsicha Tararattanakul
Southeast Asian Games medalists in karate
Competitors at the 2017 Southeast Asian Games
Competitors at the 2019 Southeast Asian Games
Competitors at the 2021 Southeast Asian Games
Monsicha Tararattanakul